A stambha is a pillar or a column employed in Indian architecture. A stambha sometimes bears inscriptions and religious emblems.

Religion 
In Hindu mythology, a stambha is believed to be a cosmic column that functions as a bond, joining heaven (Svarga) and earth (Prithvi). A number of Hindu scriptures, including the Atharva Veda, feature references to stambhas. In the Atharva Veda, a celestial stambha has been described as an infinite scaffold, which supports the cosmos and material creation.

In the legend of Narasimha, an avatara of Vishnu, the deity appears from a stambha to slay the asura Hiranyakashipu. The stambha has been interpreted to represent the axis mundi in this myth by Deborah A. Soifer.

Architecture 
Stambhas are popularly employed in Indian architecture. Different stambhas serve different purposes, including the following:
 A dhvaja stambha (flagstaff tower) is placed opposite the main shrine, on an axis with the main deity.
 A kirti stambha (glorious tower) and vijaya stambha (victory tower) are erected to commemorate victories.
 The most well-known stambhas of India are the Ashoka Stambha (Pillars of Ashoka) — erected during the reign of Ashoka, spread across the subcontinent, bearing different types of royal edicts.
 The Adi Purana — a huge manastambha — stands in front of the samavasarana of the tirthankaras, which is regarded to causes entrants to a samavasarana to shed their pride.

Gallery

See also

Related topics
Hutheesing Jain Temple
Ashoka's Major Rock Edicts
Dhar iron pillar
History of metallurgy in South Asia
Iron pillar of Delhi
Pillars of Ashoka
Heliodorus pillar
Other similar topics
Early Indian epigraphy
Indian rock-cut architecture 
List of rock-cut temples in India 
Outline of ancient India
South Indian Inscriptions
Tagundaing

References

Sources 
Dictionary of Hindu Lore and Legend by Anna Dallapiccola.

External links

Hindu architecture
Objects in Hindu mythology